1,2,4-Trichlorobenzene is an organochlorine compound, one of three isomers of trichlorobenzene. It is a derivative of benzene with three chloride substituents. It is a colorless liquid used as a solvent for a variety of compounds and materials.

Production and uses
Depending on the conditions and additives (e.g., sulfur), it can be the main product from the chlorination of benzene. It is virtually the exclusive product from the chlorination of 1,4-dichlorobenzene. It is also the main product from the dehydrochlorination of hexachlorocyclohexane.

It is useful as a high-temperature solvent, e.g. for GPC of polyolefines such as PE or PP which are otherwise insoluble.

Aside from its use as a solvent, this compound is a useful precursor to dye and pesticides.

Safety
The LD50 (oral, rats) is 756 mg/kg. Animal studies have shown that 1,2,4-trichlorobenzene affects the liver and kidney, and is possibly a teratogen. There is no regulated occupational exposure limit for chemical exposure, but the National Institute for Occupational Safety and Health recommends no greater exposure than 5 ppm, over an 8-hour workday.

See also
Chlorobenzene
Dichlorobenzene
Pentachlorobenzene
Hexachlorobenzene

References

Chlorobenzenes
Halogenated solvents
Aromatic solvents